Marc van Duvenede (c. 1674–1730) was a Flemish painter, born at Bruges. He went to Rome when he was very young, and became a scholar of Carlo Maratti, in whose academy he studied four years. There are several of his pictures in the churches and convents of his native city, of which the most esteemed is the 'Martyrdom of St. Laurence' in the chapel of St. Christopher. He died at Bruges in 1730.

References
 

1674 births
1730 deaths
18th-century Flemish painters
Artists from Bruges
Pupils of Carlo Maratta